Seidozerite is a sorosilicate from the seidozerite supergroup (a "titanium disilicate"). It was first described by Semenov, Kazakova and Simonov in 1958. Its chemical formula is Na4MnZr2Ti(Si2O7)2O2F2 and its type locality is 'Pegmatite No. 58', Lake Seydozero, Lovozero massif, Kola peninsula, Murmansk Oblast.

References 

Monoclinic minerals
Minerals in space group 13
Sorosilicates